Karl Goehring (born August 23, 1978, in Apple Valley, Minnesota) is a retired American professional ice hockey goaltender who is currently an assistant coach with the UND Fighting Hawks of the NCHC. He led Apple Valley High School to a win in the 1996 Minnesota State High School League Boys' Hockey Tournament. He also led the University of North Dakota to a win in the 2000 NCAA Men's Ice Hockey Championship.

Playing career
Goehring played four seasons for the Syracuse Crunch in the AHL, and following the abrupt departure of Tim Thomas from Jokerit in the Finnish SM-liiga, he signed with Jokerit for the 2005–06 season. Goehring was recommended to Jokerit management by Tim Thomas as a winning goaltender, but Goehring played a disappointing early season and was taken off goaltending duties in November. On November 18, 2005, he signed with the San Antonio Rampage in the AHL. Goehring was signed by the Nashville Predators on November 23, 2006, and reassigned to the Milwaukee Admirals four days later.

Goehring was released from Wilkes-Barre/Scranton on November 13, 2007. He signed a professional tryout contract (PTO) with the Norfolk Admirals on November 20, 2007.  Goehring then signed a professional tryout contract with the Syracuse Crunch.  On March 3, 2008, Goehring was named AHL Player of the Week. On July 3, 2008, Goehring was signed by the Manitoba Moose of the American Hockey League.

Coaching career 
Goehring had offers to play in Germany in the 2009–10 season, but instead of waiting to see if more opportunities arose closer to the beginning of the season on July 24, 2009, he retired from professional hockey to begin his career in coaching. He took up an assistant coaching role with the Syracuse Crunch of the AHL, with whom he set franchise records for most games played by a goaltender (176) and wins (78) during his four-year stint with the team as a player. The Crunch later let go Goehring and the rest of their coaching staff. He returned to the Crunch before the 2017-18 season following Crunch goaltending coach David Alexander's departure to the St. Louis Blues.

After two seasons with the Crunch, he returned to his alma-mater to become a full-time assistant coach with the UND Fighting Hawks.

Personal life
Goehring is the father to Lily Kate (Lily Kate Goehring) who won episode 4 of NBC's Dancing with Myself.

Awards and honors

References

External links

1978 births
American men's ice hockey goaltenders
Dayton Bombers players
Jokerit players
Living people
Manitoba Moose players
Milwaukee Admirals players
Norfolk Admirals players
San Antonio Rampage players
Syracuse Crunch players
Ice hockey players from Minnesota
North Dakota Fighting Hawks men's ice hockey players
Wilkes-Barre/Scranton Penguins players
People from Apple Valley, Minnesota
Apple Valley High School (Minnesota) alumni
AHCA Division I men's ice hockey All-Americans
NCAA men's ice hockey national champions